Kenneth Keith Steadman (June 26, 1969 — September 20, 1996) was an American film and television actor.

He was born to parents Lisa Prince and Ken Steadman on June 26, 1969, in Aberdeen, Washington.

Career
Steadman appeared in various film and television productions during the 1990s.

 Street Wars (1992)
 Beach Babes from Beyond (1993)
 Mirror Images 2 (1993)
 Indecent Behavior (1993)
 Baywatch (1993)
 I Like to Play Games (1995)
 Hindsight (1996)
 Moloney (1996)
 NYPD Blue (1996)
 Baywatch Nights (1996)
 Sliders (1996)

Death
Steadman died, at age 27, in a dune-buggy accident during the production of the "Desert Storm" episode of the television series Sliders near Victorville, California.

While filming the episode, Steadman, reprising the role of Cutter, was killed in an accident that occurred between takes. He was moving a dune buggy to the next shooting location. While he was moving the vehicle, the dune buggy overturned and crushed him, killing him instantly. According to Steadman's parents, his death was preventable.

References

External links

Ken Steadman Memorial Site, a memorial website operated by Carl and Lisa Prince, Steadman's  Mother and Stepfather.

1969 births
1996 deaths
Road incident deaths in California
People who died in ATV incidents
American male film actors
American male television actors
People from Aberdeen, Washington
Male actors from Washington (state)
20th-century American male actors